The Oscillatoriales are an order of cyanobacteria.

References

 
Bacteria orders